The year 2014 was the 5th year in the history of the Road Fighting Championship, an MMA promotion based in South Korea. 2014 started with Road FC Korea 001 and ended with Road FC 020.

List of events

Road FC 020 

Road FC 020 was an MMA event held by Road FC on December 14, 2014, at the Olympic Hall, Olympic Park in Seoul, South Korea.

Results

Road FC 019 

Road FC 019 was an MMA event held by Road FC on November 9, 2014, at the Olympic Hall, Olympic Park in Seoul, South Korea.

Results

Road FC 018 

Road FC 018 was an MMA event held by Road FC on August 30, 2014, at the Convention Hall, Convention Centre, Grand Hilton Seoul in Seoul, South Korea.

Results

Road FC 017 

Road FC 017 was an MMA event held by Road FC on August 17, 2014, at the Olympic Hall, Olympic Park in Seoul, South Korea.

Results

Road FC 016 

Road FC 016 was an MMA event held by Road FC on July 26, 2014, at the Gumi Indoor Gymnasium in Gumi, Gyeongbuk, South Korea.

Results

Road FC 015 

Road FC 015 was an MMA event held by Road FC on May 31, 2014, at the Wonju Chiak Gymnasium in Wonju, Gangwon, South Korea.

Results

Road FC Korea 003: Korea vs. Brazil 

Road FC Korea 003: Korea vs. Brazil was an MMA event held by Road FC on April 6, 2014, at the K Hotel Seoul in Seoul, South Korea.

Results

Road FC Korea 002: Korea vs. Japan 

Road FC Korea 001 was an MMA event held by Road FC on March 9, 2014, at the Convention Hall, Convention Centre, Grand Hilton Seoul in Seoul, South Korea.

Results

Road FC 014 

Road FC 014 was an MMA event held by Road FC on February 9, 2014, at the Olympic Hall, Olympic Park in Seoul, South Korea.

Results

Tournament Pair Assignment for selecting the first Champion in Road FC Featherweight   Division 
1. Extended Round

Road FC Korea 001 

Road FC Korea 001 was an MMA event held by Road FC on January 18, 2014, at the Convention Centre, Grand Hilton Seoul in Seoul, South Korea.

Results

See also
 List of Road FC events
 List of Road FC champions
 List of current Road FC fighters
 List of current mixed martial arts champions

References 

Road Fighting Championship events
2014 in mixed martial arts
2014 in South Korean sport
2014 in Asian sport